Wish You Well is a 2013 theatrical family film directed by Darnell Martin, written by David Baldacci from his 2001 novel of the same name, and starring Mackenzie Foy, Josh Lucas and Ellen Burstyn and JP Vanderloo  The movie is set in rural Virginia and follows Lou and her younger brother Oz who are forced to move to their grandmother's farm following a tragic accident.  While living on the farm Lou  dreams of following her fathers' footsteps as a writer while her grandmother Louisa Mae tries to stop a coal and gas company from taking her family farm.   The supporting cast features Ned Bellamy and Laura Fraser, the cinematographer was Frank Prinzi, and the music was by Paul Cantelon.  The film was shot in Giles County, Virginia, near the southeastern border of West Virginia.

Cast
 Mackenzie Foy as Lou Cardinal
 Josh Lucas as Cotton Longfellow
 Ellen Burstyn as Louisa Mae Cardinal
 Ned Bellamy as George Davis
 JP Vanderloo as Oz Cardinal
 Alano Miller as Eugene Randall
 Seamus Davey-Fitzpatrick as Diamond Skinner
 Antonio Ducrot as Billy Davis
 Laura Fraser as Amanda Cardinal

External links
  Wish You Well at the Internet Movie Database
 
 Official website for David Baldacci

2013 films
American drama films
Films shot in Virginia
Films set in Virginia
Films scored by Paul Cantelon
Films directed by Darnell Martin
2013 drama films
2010s American films